The Glad Eye may refer to:

 a British slang expression.  According to the Cambridge University Press, to give someone the glad eye means “to look at SB (somebody) in a way that shows you find them sexually attractive.”
The Glad Eye (1920 film), a British comedy directed by Kenelm Foss
 The Glad Eye (1927 film), a British comedy directed by Maurice Elvey